Wallasey is a constituency in Merseyside created in 1918 and represented in the House of Commons of the UK Parliament since 1992 by Angela Eagle, a member of the Labour Party.

Boundaries
1918–1950: The County Borough of Wallasey.

1950–1983: As prior but with redrawn boundaries.

1983–2010: The Metropolitan Borough of Wirral wards of Leasowe, Liscard, Moreton, New Brighton, Seacombe, and Wallasey. The constituency boundaries remained unchanged.

2010–present: The Metropolitan Borough of Wirral wards of Leasowe and Moreton East, Liscard, Moreton West and Saughall Massie, New Brighton, Seacombe, and Wallasey. The constituency's borders remain unchanged.

The constituency covers the town of Wallasey, at the north of the Wirral Peninsula, which comprises the six areas: Wallasey Village, Seacombe, Egremont, Liscard, New Brighton and Poulton, as well as Moreton and Leasowe.  It is one of four constituencies covering the Metropolitan Borough of Wirral.

Minor 2010 boundary reform and abortive proposals
The Boundary Commission initially proposed the abolition in its 2005 draft review: Wallasey was to have been linked with sections of the city of Liverpool in a cross-river constituency. The areas are linked only by a road tunnel under the river Mersey. Following opposition from political parties, local MPs and local residents, the sub-plan was dropped.  The change made was the omission of a 40 electors' sub-neighbourhood from formerly shared ward: Hoylake and Meols in favour of Wirral West.

History
The seat was created under the Representation of the People Act 1918.

Summary of results
Angela Eagle of the Labour Party gained the Wallasey seat in 1992. Eagle has achieved an absolute majority of votes since the 1997 general election inclusive. The 2015 result made the seat the 39-safest of Labour's 232 seats by percentage of majority.

The seat was Conservative until 1992, with a three-year exception during World War II when represented by an ex-mayor who had been in both the Labour and Conservative parties.  Increasing unemployment in the area saw the Conservative vote decline throughout the 1980s in local and general elections, only retaining Moreton West & Saughall Massie and Wallasey wards on the local level into the 2010s, with the remaining wards such as Leasowe and Seacombe safely Labour.

Opposition parties
A Conservative candidate has been runner-up since 1992.  Weaker in Wallasey than national average, in 2015 the candidate from UKIP, Caton, amassed +8.8% swing. Liberal Democrat, Brown, lost 11.3% of the vote in that year, whereas nationally the party suffered a record -15.2% swing.  Neither Brown nor his Green Party counterpart achieved more than 5% of the vote thereby forfeiting their deposits.

Turnout
Turnout has ranged from 82.6% in 1992 to 57.5% in 2001 — elections at which Angela Eagle was elected, and the latter election saw record-low turnout nationwide.

Prominent frontbenchers
Rt Hon Ernest Marples was Postmaster General while running the telephone network run by the General Post Office, Marples introduced subscriber trunk dialling, which eliminated the compulsory use of operators on national phone calls. On 2 June 1957, Marples brought in British postcodes and made the first draw for the new Premium Bonds. Marples was Minister of Transport (1959-1964).

His successor to the seat was the Rt Hon Lynda Chalker Minister for Europe (1986-1989) and Minister for Overseas Development (1989-1997).

Angela Eagle was Exchequer Secretary to the Treasury for two years then Minister for Pensions and Ageing Society for a year at the close of the Brown Ministry, before becoming in opposition Shadow Chief Secretary to the Treasury until October 2011, when in the general Shadow Cabinet reshuffle of Ed Miliband, she succeeded the Rt Hon Hilary Benn as Shadow Leader of the House of Commons. She unsuccessfully stood for Deputy Leadership of the Labour Party in 2015 and subsequently was appointed as Shadow Secretary of State for Business, Innovation and Skills by Jeremy Corbyn.

Constituency profile
Workless claimants, registered jobseekers, were in November 2012 higher than the national average of 3.8% and regional average of 4.4%, at 5.1% of the population based on a statistical compilation by The Guardian.

Members of Parliament

Elections

Elections in the 2010s

Elections in the 2000s

Elections in the 1990s

Elections in the 1980s

Elections in the 1970s

Elections in the 1960s

Elections in the 1950s

Elections in the 1940s

Notes
Moore-Brabazon was forced to retire early in 1942 for stating publicly (in fact in the House) the Soviet Union and Germany would hopefully destroy each other at the Battle of Stalingrad.
1939–40
Another general election was in normal circumstances required to take place before the end of 1940. The political parties had been making preparations for an election to take place from 1939 and by the end of this year, the following candidates had been selected; 
Conservative: John Moore-Brabazon 
Liberal: Robert Forster

Elections in the 1930s

Elections in the 1920s

Elections in the 1910s

See also
List of parliamentary constituencies in Merseyside
History of parliamentary constituencies and boundaries in Cheshire

Notes

References

Parliamentary constituencies in North West England
Constituencies of the Parliament of the United Kingdom established in 1918
Wallasey